The World's Strictest Parents (or World's Strictest Parents) is an international television franchise reality series developed by Twenty Twenty with its original broadcast in the United Kingdom by BBC Three. There are also many other international foreign versions (listed below) including an Australian version, a New Zealand version, and a German (German language)-version titled "Die strengsten Eltern der Welt" (The Strictest Parents of the World). As well other locales to have locally produced adaptations include Scandinavia, Turkey, and Poland. The series won an International Emmy Award for best Non-Scripted Entertainment.

Since 2013, the official YouTube channel has been uploading small snippet clips from many of the episodes, largely the UK, US and Australian broadcasts: however, these snippets, in some cases, were just whole episodes broken into smaller notable highlights of an episode. As of 2019, this has been extended to entire episodes, starting with the UK version and then moving to the Australian version. These episodes, in some cases, are not complete re-uploads of the broadcast: for example, the rundown of the teens at the beginning has been cut in some cases, depending on the teens who were broadcast in the episode. In addition, censorship has been done with profanity and surnames of certain people. The censorship has taken the form of either blurring the mouth during swearing and surname (if included) or profanity and names being bleeped in the audio tracks. Alongside these edits, the ending credits sequence is not included.

United Kingdom
Unruly British teenagers are sent to live with strict families in an experiment to try to change their behaviour. Generally they spend 10 days, later 7 days, with their host parents trying to live by the latter's rules.

All series episodes were broadcast on a weekly basis.

Series 1 (2008)
Series 1, which was filmed in the summer of 2008, had six episodes and aired from 18 September 2008 to 23 October 2008 on BBC Three.

Series 2 (2009) 
Series 2 premiered on BBC Three on 15 October 2009 and ran to 17 December.

Series 3 (2010)
Series three premiered on BBC Three on 11 October 2010, the show returned for an 11-episode run. Whilst not formally announced, it appears the teens now spend a week with their adopted families rather than the 10 days in the two previous series. Each episode aired at 9:00pm on BBC Three and was repeated at various times over the following week. It was also moved to a Monday.

Series 4 (2011)
Series 4 premiered on 3 November 2011 and featured 12 teenagers. The series ran until 15 December.

United States

Australia

The Seven Network also created their own series of The World's Strictest Parents, hosted by singer and actor Axle Whitehead. The first season debuted in Australia on 22 July 2009. However, a sneak peek was shown on 24 June 2009 and was the top watched show of the week, with 1.875 million people tuning in. Whitehead's song Way Home was featured in the advertisements. The show is classified PG.

A second season went to air on 14 July 2010, starting with two British episodes featuring Whitehead's narration.

Season 3 premiered on 10 August 2011, however the series was continually interrupted due to the airing of the third season of The X Factor Australia.

The remainder of season three was aired in the middle of 2012.

The show did not return for a fourth season in 2013, due to poor ratings. Repeats of old episodes were aired on Sunday afternoons.

Season 1 (2009)

Season 2 (2010)

Season 3 (2011–12)

Reception
The first episode attracted an audience of 1.54 million, and was the second most watched show of the night.

Turkey

Season 1 (2010)

Season 2 (2011)

New Zealand

A New Zealand adaptation of The World's Strictest Parents aired in 2012 on TV One. Only one season was made.

Season 1 (2012)

Reception

Denmark
In Denmark the show is called "Verdens strengeste forældre" and it is broadcast by TV3.

Season 1 (2011)

Season 2 (2012)

Germany
In Germany the show is called "Die strengsten Eltern der Welt". It is broadcast by Kabel Eins.

Season 1 (2009)

Season 2 (2010)

Season 3 (2011)

Unlike the original series, the teenagers don't know they are going to different parents and think it's a holiday trip. The new family usually does not speak German and the teenagers likewise usually don't speak any other language than German so they can only talk through translators. Therefore, they do not have long conversation or are given advice as in the original series.

References

Related shows
Teen Trouble
Beyond Scared Straight
The Principal's Office
Sleeping with the Family

External links
 
 About the show on the homepage of TwentyTwenty television
 Ross survived with the world's strictest parents, Echo News, 1 September 2008
 List of all cars used in the show (Currently still adding cars)

BBC Television shows
German-language television shows
2008 British television series debuts
2011 British television series endings
2011 Danish television series debuts
2012 Danish television series endings
2009 German television series debuts
2011 German television series endings
British reality television series
Danish reality television series
German reality television series
2000s Danish television series
2010s Danish television series
2000s Australian reality television series
2010s Australian reality television series
Television series by Warner Bros. Television Studios
International Emmy Award for Best Non-Scripted Entertainment winners